Henry Alejandro (Munoz) Rodríguez (born February 9, 1990) is a professional baseball infielder who is a free agent. He is 5'10" and weighs 150 lbs. He is a switch hitting batter that throws right handed. He previously played in Major League Baseball (MLB) for the Cincinnati Reds.

Career

Cincinnati Reds
The Reds selected signed Rodríguez as an amateur free agent in 2007. He played 42 games for rookie class GCL Reds in 2009, hitting .322 with 1 HR, 19 RBI and 9 steals. He played in 130 games for the Dayton Dragons and Lynchburg Hillcats in 2010, hitting .305 with 14 homers and 82 RBI, while being named a Midwest League All-Star for Dayton. In 2011, he had 566 at-bats for the single-A Bakersfield and double-A Carolina, hitting .320 with 13 homers, 81 RBI. He was added to the Reds 40-man roster on November 18, 2011.

Rodríguez began the 2012 season in Double-A with the Pensacola Blue Wahoos before later being promoted to Triple-A. On September 1, 2012, Rodríguez was promoted to the major leagues for the first time. He made his MLB debut the next day as a pinch hitter against the Houston Astros. In 12 games for Cincinnati in 2012, Rodríguez collected 3 hits in 16 plate appearances along with 2 RBI. He spent the majority of the 2013 season with the Triple-A Louisville Bats, getting 1 hit in 10 plate appearances for the Reds in 2013.

On February 12, 2014, Rodríguez was designated for assignment following the waiver claim of Brett Marshall. Rodríguez was released by the Reds organization on March 11.

Boston Red Sox
On December 16, 2014, Rodríguez signed a minor league deal with the Boston Red Sox. The Red Sox released Rodríguez on April 3, 2015.

Delfines de Ciudad del Carmen
On April 20, 2015, Rodríguez signed with the Delfines de Ciudad del Carmen of the Mexican League. He hit .359/.406/.535 in 95 games for the club in 2015.

Piratas de Campeche
On June 28, 2016, Rodríguez was traded to the Piratas de Campeche of the Mexican League. In 23 games with Campeche, Rodríguez slashed .353/.378/.518 with 3 home runs and 21 RBI.

Delfines de Ciudad del Carmen (second stint)
On October 3, 2016, Rodríguez was traded back to the Delfines de Ciudad del Carmen. He became a free agent after the 2016 season after the Delfines folded.

Generales de Durango
Rodríguez signed with the Generales de Durango of the Mexican League for the 2017 season. He hit .288/.331/.393 in 80 games for the team, along with 5 home runs and 35 RBI.

Pirates de Campeche (second stint)
On July 12, 2017, Rodríguez was traded to the Piratas de Campeche. In 2017, Rodríguez slashed .297/.379/.538 in 23 contests. In 2018, he hit 9 home runs with 58 RBI on the season. He became a free agent after the 2018 season. On April 6, 2019, Rodríguez signed with the Piratas for the 2019 season. He batted .323/.372/.532 in 114 games for Campeche in 2019, along with 23 home runs and 99 RBI. He did not play in a game in 2020 due to the cancellation of the LMB season because of the COVID-19 pandemic. Rodríguez was released on April 30, 2021.

Tigres de Quintana Roo
On June 1, 2021, Rodríguez signed with the Tigres de Quintana Roo of the Mexican League. In 21 games for the team, Rodríguez slashed .247/.306/.312 with 1 home run and 12 RBI. He was released by the Tigres on June 25, 2021.

Rieleros de Aguascalientes
On June 29, 2021, Rodríguez signed with the Rieleros de Aguascalientes of the Mexican League. He played in 29 games for Aguascalientes to close out the year, hitting .437/.455/.660 with 6 home runs, 21 RBI, and 4 stolen bases.

In 2022, Rodríguez played in 86 games for the Rieleros, slashing .354/.435/.581 with 20 home runs, 61 RBI, and 9 stolen bases. He was released by the team on February 27, 2023.

References

External links

1990 births
Living people
Águilas del Zulia players
Arizona League Reds players
Bakersfield Blaze players
Carolina Mudcats players
Cincinnati Reds players
Dayton Dragons players
Delfines de Ciudad del Carmen players
Dominican Summer League Diamondbacks/Reds players
Venezuelan expatriate baseball players in the Dominican Republic
Dominican Summer League Reds players
Generales de Durango players
Gulf Coast Reds players
Leones del Caracas players
Louisville Bats players
Lynchburg Hillcats players
Major League Baseball players from Venezuela
Major League Baseball second basemen
Mexican League baseball infielders
Pensacola Blue Wahoos players
Piratas de Campeche players
Sportspeople from Maracay
Venezuelan Summer League Devil Rays/Reds players
Venezuelan expatriate baseball players in Mexico
Venezuelan expatriate baseball players in the United States